Philadelphus is a census-designated place (CDP) in Robeson County, North Carolina, United States. The community is located between the towns of  Pembroke and Red Springs. It was established between 1796 and 1799.

Notable person
Jimmy Goins – Chairman of the Lumbee Tribe (2004–2010)

References

Census-designated places in Robeson County, North Carolina
Lumbee